
Gmina Repki is a rural gmina (administrative district) in Sokołów County, Masovian Voivodeship, in east-central Poland. Its seat is the village of Repki, which lies approximately 10 kilometres (6 mi) south-east of Sokołów Podlaski and 95 km (59 mi) north-east of Warsaw.

Villages
Gmina Repki contains the villages and settlements of Baczki, Bałki, Bohy, Borychów, Czaple-Andrelewicze, Czaple-Kolonia, Gałki, Jasień, Józin, Kamianka, Kanabród, Karskie, Kobylany Górne, Kobylany-Skorupki, Liszki, Mołomotki, Mołomotki-Dwór, Ostrówek, Ostrowiec, Remiszew Duży, Remiszew Mały, Repki, Rogów, Rudniki, Sawice-Bronisze, Sawice-Dwór, Sawice-Wieś, Skorupki, Skrzeszew, Skrzeszew E, Skwierczyn-Dwór, Skwierczyn-Wieś, Smuniew, Szkopy, Wasilew Skrzeszewski, Wasilew Szlachecki, Wierzbice Górne, Włodki, Wyrozęby-Konaty, Wyrozęby-Podawce, Zawady and Żółkwy.

Neighbouring gminas
Gmina Repki is bordered by the gminas of Bielany, Drohiczyn, Jabłonna Lacka, Korczew, Paprotnia, Sabnie and Sokołów Podlaski.

References
u
Polish official population figures 2006

Repki
Sokołów County